The Rae Craton is an Archean craton located in northern Canada north of the Superior Craton.

Ungava Peninsula
The Ungava Peninsula, situated on the northeast portion of the Canadian Shield, is where the Rae Province connects with the Superior Province.

See also
 Canadian Shield
 North American Craton

References
 Madore, L., and Y. Larbi. (2001) "Regional structural character of the northeastern Ungava Peninsula: Connection between the Rae and Superior provinces." St. John's 2001 Technical Programme SS2:  Tectonic Integration of Circum-Superior Orogens. Online Abstract:

Cratons
Historical geology
Geology of the Northwest Territories
Geology of North America